The Club Car Championship is a golf tournament on the Korn Ferry Tour. It was first played from March 29 to April 1, 2018, on the Deer Creek Course at The Landings Club in Savannah, Georgia.

Winners

Bolded golfers graduated to the PGA Tour via the Korn Ferry Tour regular-season money list.

References

External links

Coverage on the Korn Ferry Tour's official site

Korn Ferry Tour events
Golf in Georgia (U.S. state)
Sports in Savannah, Georgia
Recurring sporting events established in 2018
2018 establishments in Georgia (U.S. state)